Joseph Rafferty Jr. (born 1955) is an American educator, high school gridiron football coach, and Democratic politician from Maine. Rafferty has been the head coach of the Kennebunk High School Rams football team since 1979 and is currently serving his first term in the Maine Senate representing District 34, which consists of Kennebunk, Wells, Acton, Lebanon, North Berwick, and part of Berwick. Rafferty was born in 1955 and grew up in Woburn, Massachusetts. He attended Springfield College, graduated in 1977 and began teaching and coaching at Kennebunk High School in 1978. As an educator, he was active in the teachers' unions and helped negotiate contracts on their behalf. He retired from full-time teaching in 2018 but continues to coach football. Rafferty was elected to the Maine Senate in 2020 and is currently serving his first term.

Early life, education & teaching career
Rafferty was born in 1955 in Woburn, Massachusetts, one of six children. His father worked in a tannery and as a postal worker, and his mother was a homemaker and school cafeteria worker. His first job was at Woburn's Spence Farm as a teenager, and he attended Springfield College and graduated with a degree in physical education in 1977. He was the first person in his family to graduate from college.

Rafferty was first hired to a teaching and coaching job in Foxborough that fell through in late summer, and he drove to Maine to interview at Kennebunk High School having never been to Maine before. He began teaching and coaching at Kennebunk High School in 1978 and was the assistant football coach for one year before taking over as head coach in 1979. Rafferty was on the teachers' union executive board and negotiating team and retired from full-time teaching in 2018, although he continues to coach, substitute teach and drive buses for the school district.

On October 4, 2019, Rafferty won his 200th game as head coach of the Kennebunk Rams. As of the end of the 2020 season, he has a record of 204-177, a 1991 state championship and three trips to the championship game in 1999, 2013 and 2016.

Maine Senate
Rafferty was approached to run for office several times during his teaching career, but explained in 2020 that he had always suggested a post-retirement run as a better fit. When he retired in 2018, friends and colleagues including Maine Senate President Troy Jackson "came back after me again,” beginning in July 2019. He announced his run in February 2020. Rafferty was a clean elections candidate and used "Coach Joe" campaign signs.  He ran unopposed in the Democratic primary and defeated Republican Michael Pardue in the general election 52%-48%. Rafferty has been the chair of the Education & Cultural Affairs committee since 2020.

Personal life

Rafferty and his wife Norma Nardone, a teacher, live in Kennebunk, Maine. They have three adult daughters. Rafferty enjoys being outdoors: Fishing, hiking, boating, golf, skiing, canoeing, running and biking "as much as possible".

Electoral record

References

External links
Maine State Legislature: Sen. Joseph Rafferty (D-York)
Senator Joe Rafferty on Facebook

1955 births
Living people
People from Kennebunk, Maine
21st-century American politicians
Democratic Party Maine state senators
Springfield College (Massachusetts) alumni
High school football coaches in Maine
Schoolteachers from Maine
People from Woburn, Massachusetts